Lansdowne is a subway station on Line 2 Bloor–Danforth of the Toronto subway in Toronto, Ontario, Canada. The main station entrance is located just north of Bloor Street on Lansdowne Avenue, with a secondary unstaffed entrance on Emerson Avenue. Opened in 1966, the station lies approximately 561 metres (1,842 feet) from its nearest station to the west, Dundas West. The station is in the Dovercourt-Wallace Emerson-Junction neighbourhood on the edge of the Bloordale Village strip. Wi-Fi service is available at this station.

Construction started in June 2019 to install three elevators to make Lansdowne station accessible. One elevator was planned to connect the street level to the station concourse. Two other elevators were planned to connect the concourse to the east- and westbound platforms. In December 2022, the project was completed as planned and the station became accessible. As part of the project, the station received public art.

Surface connections

Transfers to buses occur at curbside stops on Lansdowne Avenue at this station.

TTC routes serving the station include:

References

External links

Line 2 Bloor–Danforth stations
Railway stations in Canada opened in 1966